The South Korea women's national handball team is the national team of South Korea. Since 1984 the Korean team has not only participated constantly in Olympic Games but also ranked among the top four nations every time until 2012. Korea grabbed the gold medal in 1988 and 1992, won the silver medal in 1984, 1996, 2004 and took bronze medal in 2008. They have earned two World Championship medals so far: In 1995, they also won the World Championship title in Austria/Hungary 1995 World Women's Handball Championship, they came off third to secure the bronze medal at the Croatia in 2003 World Women's Handball Championship. It is a twelve time Asian Champion, the tournament has been won by any other nation only twice.

Both the men's and women's and children's teams failed to qualify in the regional qualifiers for the 2008 Beijing Olympics in 2007 August due to the biased refereeing, but the International Handball Federation ordered replays of both qualifying tournaments after acknowledging biased officiating by Middle Eastern referees. South Korea beat Japan in both the men's and women's matches and qualified for the Beijing Olympic Games in 2008 January. However, the Executive Committee of the Kuwait-based federation, which had rejected the International Handball Federation's ruling to hold the replays, agreed to fine Japan and South Korea $1,000 and issued a warning to both countries. In addition, the Asian Handball Federation appealed the IHF's decision to the Court of Arbitration for Sport, which ruled the Asian women's qualification invalid and forced the Korean ladies to play in the final Olympic qualifying tournament. The replay was decided to be invalid by the Court. The Korean women's team earned their ticket to the Beijing Olympics at the Olympic qualifying game held at Nîmes, France.
In the semi-final match of 2008 Beijing Olympic games with Norway, Norway's deciding goal was requested to be annulled by the Korean delegation, because they claimed the ball had not crossed the goal line before the end whistle of the game. Korea's appeal was turned down by the IHF's Disciplinary Commission, confirming the end result to be 29–28 in favor of Norway.

The 2008 film Forever the Moment is a fictionalized account of the teams' journey to the 2004 Athens Olympics.

Results

Olympic Games

World Championship
 1978 – 10–12th place
 1982 – 6th place
 1986 – 11th place
 1990 – 11th place
 1993 – 11th place
 1995 –  Champions 
 1997 – 5th place
 1999 – 9th place
 2001 – 15th place
 2003 –  3rd place
 2005 – 8th place
 2007 – 6th place
 2009 – 6th place
 2011 – 11th place
 2013 – 12th place
 2015 – 14th place
 2017 – 13th place
 2019 – 11th place
 2021 – 14th place
 2023 – Qualified

Asian Games
 1990 –  Champions
 1994 –  Champions
 1998 –  Champions
 2002 –  Champions
 2006 –  Champions
 2010 –  3rd place
 2014 –  Champions
 2018 –  Champions

Asian Championship
 1987 –  Champions
 1989 –  Champions
 1991 –  Champions
 1993 –  Champions
 1995 –  Champions
 1997 –  Champions
 1999 –  Champions
 2000 –  Champions
 2002 –  Runners-up
 2004 –  3rd place
 2006 –  Champions
 2008 –  Champions
 2010 –  Runners-up
 2012 –  Champions
 2015 –  Champions
 2017 –  Champions
 2018 –  Champions
 2021 –  Champions
 2022 –  Champions

Other tournaments
 Carpathian Trophy 1994 – 2nd place
 Carpathian Trophy 2006 – 2nd place
 Møbelringen Cup 2017 – 4th place

Team

Current squad
Squad for the 2021 World Women's Handball Championship.

Head coach: Jang In-ik

Notable players
Lim O-kyeong – World Handball Player of the Year (1996)
Kim Hyun-mee – World Handball Player of the Year (1989)

See also
 South Korea men's national handball team

References

External links

IHF profile

Korea, South
Women's handball in South Korea
Handball